The Albanian National Front Party is a nationalist political party in Albania, Kosovo, and North Macedonia.

History
The Balli Kombëtar was revived in Albania as a political party in the early 1990s . Founded under the leadership of Abas Ermenji, a surviving Ballist, who escaped from Albania when the communists declared victory in 1945. In 1996 it won 5 percent of the popular vote and two seats in parliament. It has since declined. In the 2001 elections it was part of the Union for Victory (Bashkimi për Fitoren) coalition which received 37.1% of the vote and 46 members of parliament.

The National Front has chapters in Kosovo, led by Sylejman Daka & in North Macedonia, led by Vebi Xhemaili.

Ideology
The National Front bear a strong resemblance to their predecessors of the same name, the Balli Kombëtar. The National Front is an independent political formation, whose goals are to unite the Albanian people residing within and outside the borders of Albania regardless of gender, religion and social status. The party strives to create the conditions of spiritual, cultural and political unity of the Albanian people within and outside of Albania. The National Front advocate high economic and educational development of Albanians as well as strengthening the legal basis of the Albanian state, institutions, and for the prosperity of the country and improvement of the material culture of the Albanian people.

Branches

Kosovo
The Kosovo branch of the National Front was formed in 1997 by Naser Husaj. Prior to the National Front in Kosovo, the Albanian National Front Strongly advocated for an independent Kosovo from Yugoslavia prior to the break up. On 6 August 1998, the National Front in Albania demanded that Albania must declare war on Serbia to help fight for Kosovo in the Kosovo War. However, the request was denied by all parties in the Albanian assembly at the time.

North Macedonia
The North Macedonia branch of the National front was formed in Tetovo in 2004. Reports circulated that leaflets were spreading in Tetovo stating that the general headquarters of the National Front invites the Albanian population to join this organization in the Šar Mountains in order to "resolve the Albanian question" once and for all. They strongly opposed the autonomy referendum in 2004, calling the referendum anti-Albanian.

The National Front are at odds with the Macedonian Albanian political parties, Democratic Union for Integration and Democratic Party of Albanians. The National Front implore all Albanians of Macedonia to not take into account any promises or statements by Menduh Thaçi or Ali Ahmeti, claiming they do not represent the Albanians of North Macedonia and consider them as 'puppets' controlled by the government.

Menduh Thaçi has claimed that as long as there is the Democratic Party of Albanians in North Macedonia, there will be no formation of the National Front party. Ali Ahmeti, a former socialist and one time Guerrilla fighter (many KLA commanders and soldiers dispute his glorified representation)
is also against the National Front as he believes they are against preserving the integrity and sovereignty of North Macedonia.

Membership
There are prerequisites that need to be fulfilled to become a member of the party. Not accepted to join the party are:
Those who propagate views and ideas that are unconstitutional & anti-national.
Former members of the Party of Labour of Albania and Communist Party of Albania, communists, fascists, anti-nationalists, & former agents of the Sigurimi.
Thieves, criminals and members of organised crime.
Those who belong to another party.

PBK Council
Members of the Council:
Chairman: Adriatik Alimadhi
Deputy Chairman: Majlinda Toro
Chairman of National Council: Luan Myftiu
Secretary General: Arben Hoxha
Organizing Secretary: Kujtim Lamaj

External links
Albanian National Front

References

Albanian nationalist parties
Conservative parties in Albania
Far-right political parties
Political parties in Albania
Right-wing populism in Albania
Political parties established in 1989
1989 establishments in Albania
Anti-communist organizations in Albania
Anti-communist parties